Avi Saban (born 10 May 1989) is an Israeli football player.

He is the younger brother of Klemi Saban.

References

External links
 

1989 births
Living people
Israeli Jews
Israeli footballers
Beitar Nes Tubruk F.C. players
Hapoel Pardesiya F.C. players
F.C. Tira players
Footballers from Netanya
Association football defenders